Made in the Shade, released in 1975, is the third official compilation album by the Rolling Stones, and the first under their Atlantic Records contract. It covers material from Sticky Fingers (1971), Exile on Main St. (1972), Goats Head Soup (1973) and It's Only Rock 'n' Roll (1974).

Background
The Stones had two previous "official" compilation albums on Decca Records, Big Hits (High Tide and Green Grass) in 1966 and Through The Past, Darkly (Big Hits Vol. 2) in 1969. In addition, 1971's Hot Rocks 1964-1971 and 1972's More Hot Rocks (Big Hits & Fazed Cookies) were released by Allen Klein's ABKCO Records without The Rolling Stones' authorisation.

The material on Made in the Shade surveys the highlights from the band's first four post-Decca/London era thus far, with no new material.

Although Made in the Shade bought The Rolling Stones time to deliver their next studio album (they were midway through recording Black and Blue upon this album's June 1975 release), it was also released to capitalize on the band's summer Tour of the Americas.

Release and reception

Made in the Shade, which had to compete with the latest cash-in ABKCO release — this time an outtakes compilation called Metamorphosis — reached No. 14 in the UK Albums Chart and No. 6 in the US Billboard 200, eventually going platinum. Subsequent Rolling Stones compilation albums have also anthologised tracks included on this album.

Robert Christgau writes in his review: "Six tracks from two of the greatest albums of the decade and four from two of the more dubious ones. Not the four best, either."

In 2005, Made in the Shade was remastered and reissued by Virgin Records.

Track listing
All tracks written by Mick Jagger and Keith Richards.
  "Brown Sugar" – 3:48
  "Tumbling Dice" – 3:45
  "Happy" – 3:04
  "Dance Little Sister" – 4:11
  "Wild Horses" – 5:42
  "Angie" – 4:33
  "Bitch" – 3:38
  "It's Only Rock'n Roll (But I Like It)" – 5:07
  "Doo Doo Doo Doo Doo (Heartbreaker)" – 3:26
  "Rip This Joint" – 2:22

Personnel
The Rolling Stones
Mick Jagger – vocals
Keith Richards – electric and acoustic guitars; bass guitar and vocals on "Happy"
Mick Taylor – electric, acoustic and slide guitar (1, 4-10); bass guitar on "Tumbling Dice"
Bill Wyman – bass guitar
Charlie Watts – drums

Charts

Certifications

References 

1975 greatest hits albums
Albums produced by Jimmy Miller
Albums produced by the Glimmer Twins
The Rolling Stones compilation albums
Rolling Stones Records compilation albums
Virgin Records compilation albums